Seven Crows is an original novel based on the television series Buffy the Vampire Slayer and Angel.

Book description

Somewhere on  the border between Mexico and Arizona lies a town where Riley Finn and his wife Samantha have been assigned to work. Their mission is to track down recent deaths in the desert area, there's a chance there might be some supernatural occurrence in relation to the deaths. A miscommunication results in two known vampire killers being hired instead of one, Buffy and Angel. The situation is awkward but both are more than willing to put aside personal differences in order to destroy the cross-border vampiric threat.

Riley and Sam cannot count on back-up from their normal team, as high-level string pulling has pushed them off the case officially.

The four discover there is more than just seemingly random vampire murders when more than one supernatural threat shows up and local hospitals begin filling with the sick and the dying. Crows are also prevalent as well. Many are mysteriously dying. Living crows seem to be warning the foursome of future threats based on an old poem.

Crow poem
The poem goes like this: "One crow sorrow/Two crows mirth/Three crows a wedding/Four crows a birth/Five crows silver/Six crows gold/Seven crows a secret/Which must never be told".

Continuity

Supposed to be set in the middle of Buffy season 7, and Angel season 4.

Canonical issues

Buffy/Angel books such as this one are not usually considered by fans as canonical. Some fans consider them stories from the imaginations of authors and artists, while other fans consider them as taking place in an alternative fictional reality. However unlike fan fiction, overviews summarising their story, written early in the writing process, were 'approved' by both Fox and Joss Whedon (or his office), and the books were therefore later published as officially Buffy/Angel merchandise.

External links

Reviews
Litefoot1969.bravepages.com - Review of this book by Litefoot
Teen-books.com - Reviews of this book
Nika-summers.com - Review of this book by Nika Summers

2003 American novels
2003 fantasy novels
Books based on Buffy the Vampire Slayer
Angel (1999 TV series) novels
Novels by John Vornholt